Wyre Forest School (formerly Stourminster Special School) is a school in Kidderminster, Worcestershire, for students with  complex special needs, and  about  one fifth of the students are on the autistic spectrum continuum. It  caters for ages 7 to 16 and has about 120 mixed gender students on  roll. The school has a very wide catchment area and students come from varied social  backgrounds.

The school was established on  1 September 2011, following a merger of Stourminster Special School and Blakebrook Special School and will continue to  operate from existing premises until new accommodation has been built in the Habberley Learning Village that houses Baxter College and St. John's CE Primary School.

An April 2007 Ofsted report accorded the school a Grade 2 (Good).

References

Schools for people on the autistic spectrum
Special schools in Worcestershire
Educational institutions established in 1960
1960 establishments in England
2011 establishments in England
Educational institutions established in 2011
Community schools in Worcestershire